Dillian Whyte vs. Otto Wallin was a scheduled heavyweight professional boxing match contested between the defending WBC interim champion, Dillian Whyte, and former WBA Continental champion, Otto Wallin. The fight was scheduled to take place on October 30, 2021, at The O2 Arena in London, England.

The fight was cancelled after Dillian Whyte sustained an injury in training.

Background 
Dillian Whyte first won the vacant WBC interim heavyweight title when he defeated Óscar Rivas on 20 July 2019, in a bout in which he survived a ninth-round knockdown to claim a unanimous decision victory. He subsequently lost the title when he suffered a brutal knockout loss against Alexander Povetkin on 22 August 2020, before avenging his loss in an immediate rematch against Povetkin on 27 March 2021 to regain his title.

Otto Wallin had suffered his first professional defeat against former unified heavyweight champion Tyson Fury on 14 September 2019, but rebounded with a two-fight win streak coming into the fight against Whyte, having defeated American duo Travis Kauffman and Dominic Breazeale since his sole loss against Fury.

Fight card

References 

2021 in boxing
Boxing in London
2021 in British sport
October 2021 sports events in the United Kingdom
2021 sports events in London
International sports competitions in London
Boxing matches